The Baker House is a historic house at 501 Main Street in North Little Rock, Arkansas, United States. It is an L-shaped structure, 2½ stories in height, with a three-story round tower at the crook of the L. A highly decorated porch is built around the tower, providing access to the entrance. Built in 1898–99, it is one of the few surviving high-style Queen Anne Victorians in the city. It was built by A. E. Colburn, a local contractor, as his private residence, and was purchased in 1916 by C. J. and Annie Baker. Baker was from 1904 to 1906 the superintendent of North Little Rock's schools.

The house was listed on the National Register of Historic Places in 1978. It is also listed in the residential section of the Argenta Historic District.

The home is now a boutique hotel and Airbnb owned by Stacy and Nathan Hamilton, operated under the name "The Baker".
The Baker is a new concept in traveling. They have designer amenities, full service housekeeping, and complimentary minibars, just like full-service hotels. But with private self-check-in, keypad door locks on the rooms, and text responses to every guest request. They offer the privacy of an Airbnb. The Baker 501 Main is a historic icon right on Main Street in the Argenta Arts District of North Little Rock. Stacy and Nathan Hamilton took the fading historic Baker House Bed and Breakfast and gave it new life for the next generation.

See also
National Register of Historic Places listings in Pulaski County, Arkansas

References

Houses on the National Register of Historic Places in Arkansas
Queen Anne architecture in Arkansas
Houses completed in 1898
Houses in North Little Rock, Arkansas
National Register of Historic Places in Pulaski County, Arkansas
Historic district contributing properties in Arkansas